Wheat warehouse itch is a cutaneous condition caused by a mite, Cheyletus malaccensis.

See also 
 Murine typhus
 List of cutaneous conditions

References 

Parasitic infestations, stings, and bites of the skin